The Ukrainian Canadian Congress (UCC) is a nonprofit umbrella organization of Ukrainian-Canadian political, cultural, and religious organizations.

History 
Originally known as the Ukrainian Canadian Committee (by which it was known until 1989), it was established as a result of the efforts of the Ukrainian Canadian community in November 1940 by the Government of Canada.

In August 2022, Russia designated the Ukrainian Canadian Congress as an "undesirable organisation".

Leadership 
The UCC National President is Alexandra Chyczij. The previous UCC National President was Paul M. Grod (2007–2018), who later became the President of the Ukrainian World Congress.

Shevchenko Medal
The UCC has issued the Shevchenko Medal to the following recipients:

 Eugene Czolij
 Stephen Harper
 Isydore Hlynka
 Michael (Khoroshy)
 Paul Konoplenko-Zaporozhetz
 Michael Luchkovich
 Lubomyr Luciuk
 Mykola Plaviuk
 Peter Savaryn
 John Sopinka
 Steven Staryk
 Roman Waschuk
 Borys Wrzesnewskyj

Member organizations 
In addition to its provincial councils and local branches, the Ukrainian Canadian Congress consists of numerous national members:

Source:

Notes

References

External links 
Ukrainian Canadian Congress
Archives of the Ukrainian Canadian Congress, under of the former name Ukrainian Canadian Committee (Ukrainian Canadian Committee, or, Komitet Ukrayints's iv Kanady fonds, R3729) are held at Library and Archives Canada

Ukrainian-Canadian culture
Undesirable organizations in Russia
Organizations established in 1940